The 17th District of the Iowa House of Representatives in the state of Iowa.

Current elected officials
Matt Windschitl is the representative currently representing the district.

Past representatives
The district has previously been represented by:
 Murray C. Lawson, 1971–1973
 John C. Mendenhall, 1973–1975
 Roger Halvorson, 1975–1983
 Del Stromer, 1983–1989
 Stewart Iverson, 1989–1995
 Russell Teig, 1995–2003
 Bill Dix, 2003–2007
 Pat Grassley, 2007–2013
 Matt Windschitl, 2013–present

References

017